Lieutenant General Suhartono (born 15 April 1966) is a senior officer of the Indonesian Navy who graduated from the Indonesian Naval Academy in 1988. Currently, he is the 48th Commander of the Naval Doctrine, Education and Training Development Command (Kodiklat). Previously, he was the  Commandant of the Marine Corps. and also served as Commander of Paspampres,  Commander of Lantamal XI/Merauke, Naval Academy Regiment, Asrena Kormar and Expert Staff at Koarmabar.

Notes

1966 births
Living people
Indonesian generals
People from Central Java